Ramna massacre was the massacre of over 250 Bengali Hindus who lived in the region around the Ramna Kali Temple in East Pakistan by the Pakistani army on the night of 27 March, 1971. It is estimated that around 250 Hindus were killed in the massacre.

Background 
The village around the Ramna Kali temple was an ancient Hindu settlement at the centre of the Dhaka Race Course. It was inhabited by around 250 Hindu men, women and children. Even in the most deadliest of Hindu-Muslim riots in Dhaka, the village has remained unaffected.

Events 
Dr. John E. Rohde of USAID, who visited the place on 29 March, witnessed charred corpses of men, women and children who had been killed by machine guns and then set on fire. The Pakistani army doused the temple with petrol and gunpowder and set it on fire, along with around 50 cows. 101 Hindus including the priest of the Ramna Kali temple were killed.

Memorial 

A memorial in front of the makeshift temple lists the names of 69 persons killed in the massacre. On 27 March 2011, a memorial service was held in the compound of the Ramna Kali temple in honour of the victims of the Ramna massacre.

References 

1971 in Bangladesh
Massacres of Bengali Hindus in East Pakistan
1971 Bangladesh genocide
Massacres committed by Pakistan in East Pakistan
Persecution of Hindus
Persecution by Muslims
March 1971 events in Bangladesh